Uruguay will compete at the 2014 Summer Youth Olympics, in Nanjing, China from 16 August to 28 August 2014.

Sailor Dolores Moreira was named the flagbearer of the country at the opening ceremony.

Athletics

Uruguay qualified one athlete.

Qualification Legend: Q=Final A (medal); qB=Final B (non-medal); qC=Final C (non-medal); qD=Final D (non-medal); qE=Final E (non-medal)

Boys
Field Events

Basketball

Uruguay qualified a boys' team based on the 1 June 2014 FIBA 3x3 National Federation Rankings.

Boys' Tournament

Roster
 Gaston de Orta
 Brian Gonzalez
 Joaquin Jones
 Camilo Marino

Group Stage

Knockout Stage

Beach Volleyball

Uruguay qualified a boys' and girls' team from their performance at the 2014 CSV Youth Beach Volleyball Tour.

Equestrian

Uruguay qualified a rider.

Field Hockey

Uruguay qualified a girls' team based on its performance at the 2014 Youth American Championship.

Girls' Tournament

Roster

 Valeria Agazzi Galeano
 Milagros Algorta Ferrari
 Constanza Barrandeguy Fernandez
 Maria Cecilia Casarotti Gaminara
 Lucia Castro Saenz de Zumaran
 Paula Costa Puig
 Augustina Domingo Esposto
 Barbara Petrik Vidal
 Augustina Sanchez Greppi

Group Stage

Quarterfinal

Crossover

Fifth and sixth place

Sailing

Uruguay qualified one boat based on its performance at the Byte CII Central & South American Continental Qualifiers.

Swimming

Uruguay qualified one swimmer.

Girls

Table Tennis

Uruguay qualified one athlete based on its performance at the Latin American Qualification Event.

Singles

Team

Qualification Legend: Q=Main Bracket (medal); qB=Consolation Bracket (non-medal)

References

2014 in Uruguayan sport
Nations at the 2014 Summer Youth Olympics
Uruguay at the Youth Olympics